(also known as Tsutomu Iida) was a Japanese anime creator, director, screenwriter. Iida died due to lung cancer.

Iida was born in Urakawa, Hokkaido and graduated from Hokkaido Urakawa High School. He was a member of the Japan Animation Creators Association (JAniCA).

He died of lung cancer at a hospital in Kiyose, Tokyo on November 26, 2010 at the age of 49. At the farewell ceremony, Hayao Miyazaki read a eulogy. He passed during production of the anime Towa No Quon, which he had been set to direct. After his death, production was taken over by Takeshi Mori, who was credited as co-director.

Filmography 
 Nausicaä of the Valley of the Wind (1984) - In-between animation
 Lupin III Part III (1984-1985) - Key animation (Oh! Production) (5 eps.)
 Legend of the Gold of Babylon (1985) - Key animation
 Castle in the Sky (1986) - Assistant director
 Devilman: Tanjou Hen (1987) - Director, screenwriter
 Devilman: Yocho Sirène Hen (1990) - Director, screenwriter
 CB Chara Nagai Go World (1991) - Director, storyboard
 Gin Rei (1994) - Storyboard (ep. 2)
 Mighty Space Miners (1994-1995) - Director
 Mobile Suit Gundam: The 08th MS Team (1996-1999) - Director (eps. 7–12), storyboard (eps. 6–11), unit director (ep. 6), key animation (ep. 11)
 Mobile Suit Gundam: The 08th MS Team: Miller's Report (1998) - Director, storyboard (Gonzo), animation director
 Blue Submarine No.6 (1998-2000) - Planning cooperation
 Cowboy Bebop (1998-1999) - Storyboard (ep. 19)
 The Big O (1999-2000) - Storyboard (eps. 4, 11)
 Vandread (2000) - Planning association
 The King of Braves GaoGaiGar Final (2000-2003) - Storyboard (ep. 2)
 Hellsing (2001-2002) - Director, storyboard (eps. 12–13)
 Vandread the Second Stage (2002) - Planning cooperation
 Yukikaze (2002-2005) - Planning association
 The King of Braves GaoGaiGar Final -Grand Glorious Gathering- (2005) - Storyboard
 Tide-Line Blue (2005) - Director, storyboard (eps. 1, 6, 12), original creator
 Origin: Spirits of the Past (2006) - Storyboard, concept
 Mobile Suit Gundam: The 08th MS Team U.C.0079+α (manga) (2007-2011) - Story, art
 Blassreiter (2008) - Storyboard (eps. 6, 14)
 Birdy the Mighty: Decode (2008) - Storyboard (ep. 5)
 Shangri-La (2009) - Storyboard (ep. 6), design
 Towa no Quon (2011) - Director, planning

References

External links

1961 births
2010 deaths
Anime directors
Deaths from lung cancer
People from Hokkaido